Diệp Minh Châu (10 February 1919 - 12 July 2002) was a Vietnamese painter and sculptor. He studied at the University of Hanoi. He was awarded the Ho Chi Minh Prize for fine art in 1996.

Works

 "Passing the mangrove forest” (Gouache, 1947) Vietnam National Museum of Fine Arts

Comparison of the same statues made from different material:

References

1919 births
2002 deaths
20th-century Vietnamese sculptors
20th-century Vietnamese painters